The Bühlmann decompression algorithm is a mathematical model (algorithm) of the way in which inert gases enter and leave the human body as the ambient pressure changes. Versions are used to create Bühlmann decompression tables and in personal dive computers to compute no-decompression limits and decompression schedules for dives in real-time. These decompression tables allow divers to plan the depth and duration for dives and the required decompression stops.

The algorithm was developed by Swiss physician Dr. Albert A. Bühlmann, who did research into decompression theory at the Laboratory of Hyperbaric Physiology at the University Hospital in Zürich, Switzerland.
The results of Bühlmann's research that began in 1959 were published in a 1983 German book whose English translation was entitled Decompression-Decompression Sickness. The book was regarded as the most complete public reference on decompression calculations and was used soon after in dive computer algorithms.

The model assumes perfusion limited gas exchange and multiple parallel tissue compartments and uses an inverse exponential model for in-gassing and out-gassing, both of which are assumed to occur in the dissolved phase (without bubble formation).

Principles
Building on the previous work of John Scott Haldane and Robert Workman, and working off funding from Shell Oil Company, Bühlmann designed studies to establish the longest half-times of nitrogen and helium in human tissues. These studies were confirmed by the Capshell experiments in the Mediterranean Sea in 1966.

The basic idea is to represent the human body by multiple tissues (compartments) of different saturation half-times and to calculate the partial pressure  of the inert gases in each of the  compartments:

with the initial partial pressure , the partial pressure in the breathing gas  (minus the vapour pressure of water in the lung of about 60 mbar), the time of exposure  and the compartment-specific saturation half-time .

When the gas pressure drops, the compartments start to off-gas.

are used:

Different versions calculate  and  differently, use different half-times or fewer compartments.

Versions
Several versions of the Bühlmann algorithm have been developed, both by Bühlmann and by later workers. The naming convention used to identify the algorithms is a code starting ZH-L, from Zürich (ZH), limits (L) followed by the number of tissue compartments, and other unique identifiers.
For example:
 ZHL-16 or ZH-L16A: The original 16-compartment algorithm (no conservatism at all).
 ZHL-16B: The 16-compartment algorithm modified for dive table production, using slightly more conservative “a” values, mainly in the middle compartments. Recently used in dive computers with high performance processor units, it is more flexible (especially in tech dives) compared to the ZHL16C
 ZHL-16C: The 16-compartment algorithm with further modification to the middle and faster “a” values, intended for use in dive computers as a "package". It can be used with almost all low-level processor units but it is less flexible compared to the ZHL16B.
 ZHL-16 ADT DD: 16-compartment adaptive model used by Uwatec for their trimix-enabled computers. Modified in the middle compartments from the original ZHL-C, is adaptive to diver workload and includes Profile-Determined Intermediate Stops. Profile modification is by means of "MB Levels", personal option conservatism settings, which are not defined in the manual.
 ZHL-12: 
 ZHL-8: A version using a reduced number of tissue compartments to reduce the computational load for personal dive computers.
 ZHL-8 ADT: 8-compartment adaptive model used by Uwatec. This model may reduce the no-stop limit or require the diver to complete a compensatory decompression stop after an ascent rate violation, high work level during the dive, or low water temperature. This algorithm is used in computers which can accurately monitor air consumption and instantaneous rate of air consumption to model work load (exertion) via changes in the rate of gas consumption, which allows plausible modelling of additional decompression obligation based on exertion at depth. It also monitors ambient temperature and selects the choice of risk tissue accordingly. This results in earlier and longer decompression requirements in colder water.
 ZHL-8 ADT MB: A version of the ZHL-8 ADT claimed to suppress MicroBubble formation.
 ZHL-8 ADT MB PDIS: Profile-Determined Intermediate Stops.
 ZHL-8 ADT MB PMG: Predictive Multi-Gas.

Ascent rates
Ascent rate is intrinsically a variable, and may be selected by the programmer or user for table generation or simulations, and measured as real-time input in dive computer applications.

The rate of ascent  to the first stop is limited to 3 bar per minute for compartments 1 to 5, 2 bar per minute for compartments 6 and 7, and 1 bar per minute for compartments 8 to 16. Chamber decompression may be continuous, or if stops are preferred they may be done at intervals of 1 or 3 m.

Gradient factors
User input of gradient factors is sometimes available for planning and real time applications.

Tables
Max Hahn first used Bühlmann's algorithm to develop dive tables for the Swiss Underwater Sport Association. In 1987, the SAA Bühlmann System was developed by Bob Cole. This system used the dive tables and a set of rules so that people could dive safely and stay below their no-decompression limit. The tables are still used today and are very popular; many dive computers still use the ZHL-8 algorithm and many tables are based on the ZHL-16 algorithm or derivatives. These calculations also include considerations for repetitive and altitude diving.

References

Further reading

External links
Many articles on the Bühlmann tables are available on the web.
 – Detailed background and worked examples
 Decompression Theory: Robert Workman and Prof A Bühlmann. An overview of the history of Bühlmann tables
 Stuart Morrison: DIY Decompression (2000). Works through the steps involved in using Bühlmann's ZH-L16 algorithm to write a decompression program.

Decompression algorithms